Volodymyr Rohovsky (21 February 1954 – March 2022) was a footballer from the former Soviet Union who played for Shakhtar Donetsk.

In 1979 Rohovsky played a couple of games for the Ukrainian SSR team at the Spartakiad of the Peoples of the USSR.

Rohovsky died in March 2022, at the age of 68.

References

1954 births
2022 deaths
Sportspeople from Kherson
Soviet footballers
Association football forwards
FC Shakhtar Donetsk players
FC Krystal Kherson players
SC Odesa players